Caffrocrambus angulilinea is a moth in the family Crambidae. It was described by Warren in 1914. It is found in Namibia and South Africa.

References

Crambinae
Moths described in 1914
Moths of Africa